The Hoanya are a Taiwanese Aboriginal people who live primarily in Changhua County, Chiayi City, Nantou County, and near Tainan City.

Their language, Hoanya, is now extinct.

The Lloa people and Arikun people are generally considered to be a part of the Hoanya people.

See also
 Hoanya language
 Kingdom of Middag
 Taiwanese indigenous peoples

References 

Taiwanese indigenous peoples